Nathan Scherrer, born 1988 in Northport, Michigan, is a Grammy Award-winning and nominated music video producer and the founder of the Los Angeles-based video production company Freenjoy. Through Freenjoy, Nathan Scherrer has produced music videos for a range of artists including The Weeknd, Kendrick Lamar, Pharrell Williams, Travis Scott, Beyonce, NIKE, Harry Styles, and Ariana Grande.

Early life
Nathan Scherrer graduated from the University of Michigan in 2011 and produced his first music video in 2013, entitled "Back to Me" for artist Joel Compass. The video, which won the 2014 Jury Award at the SXSW Film Festival in Austin Texas, has surpassed half a million views on line. Following that first video, he produced Justin Timberlake's "Tunnel Vision".

Highlighted producing credits

References

1988 births
Living people
University of Michigan alumni